The 38th Annual Tony Awards were held on June 3, 1984, at the Gershwin Theatre and broadcast by CBS television. Hosts were Julie Andrews and Robert Preston.

The ceremony
Presenters and performers: Carol Channing, Marilyn Cooper, Nancy Dussault, Robert Goulet, Robert Guillaume, Dustin Hoffman, Beth Howland, Larry Kert, Michele Lee, Dorothy Loudon, Shirley MacLaine, Liza Minnelli, Mary Tyler Moore, Anita Morris, Bernadette Peters, Anthony Quinn, Tony Randall, Tony Roberts, Chita Rivera, Leslie Uggams, Gwen Verdon, Raquel Welch

Musicals represented:
 Baby ("I Want It All" - Liz Callaway, Catherine Cox and Beth Fowler)
 La Cage aux Folles ("We Are What We Are" - Company/"I Am What I Am" - George Hearn)
 The Tap Dance Kid ("Fabulous Feet" - Hinton Battle, Company)
 The Rink ("Wallflower" - Chita Rivera and Liza Minnelli)
 Sunday in the Park with George ("Sunday" - Mandy Patinkin, Bernadette Peters, Company)

There was a special salute to the songs of John Kander and Fred Ebb, Jerry Herman and Stephen Sondheim. The Finale was a medley of Jerry Herman songs, including "Milk and Honey' and "Shalom" (Robert Goulet), "Before the Parade Passes By" (Carol Channing), "It Only Takes a Moment" (Nancy Dussault), "Hello, Dolly!" (chorus plus Channing), "If He Walked Into My Life" (Leslie Uggams) and "Mame" (Dorothy Loudon); a Mack & Mabel medley with Robert Preston ("I Won't Send Roses") and Bernadette Peters ("Time Heals Everything"); and a La Cage aux Folles segment with Gene Barry, the Cagelles, and George Hearn, ("I Am What I Am"). The first Brooks Atkinson Award for lifetime contribution to the theater was given to Al Hirschfeld.

Winners and nominees
Winners in bold

Special awards
 To director Peter Brook and producer Alexander H. Cohen for La tragédie de Carmen, for outstanding achievement in musical theatre
 Peter Feller, a master craftsman who has devoted forty years to theatre stagecraft and magic
 A Chorus Line producer Joseph Papp was presented with a special Gold Tony Award in honor of becoming Broadway's longest-running musical
 Al Hirschfeld,  Brooks Atkinson Award for Lifetime Achievement in the Theatre
Regional Theatre Award
 Old Globe Theatre, San Diego, California

Multiple nominations and awards

These productions had multiple nominations:

10 nominations: Sunday in the Park with George 
9 nominations: La Cage aux Folles 
7 nominations: Baby, The Real Thing and The Tap Dance Kid   
6 nominations: Heartbreak House 
5 nominations: The Rink
4 nominations: Glengarry Glen Ross, A Moon for the Misbegotten and Noises Off 
3 nominations: End of the World  
2 nominations: Play Memory   

The following productions received multiple awards.

6 wins: La Cage aux Folles 
5 wins: The Real Thing 
2 wins:  Sunday in the Park with George and The Tap Dance Kid

See also
 Drama Desk Awards
 1984 Laurence Olivier Awards – equivalent awards for West End theatre productions
 Obie Award
 New York Drama Critics' Circle
 Theatre World Award
 Lucille Lortel Awards

References

External links
 Tony Awards official site

Tony Awards ceremonies
1984 in theatre
1984 theatre awards
Tony
1984 in New York City